François Ravaillac (1578 – 27 May 1610) was a French Catholic zealot who assassinated King Henry IV of France in 1610.

Biography

Early life and education
Ravaillac was born in 1578 at Angoulême of an educated family: his grandfather François Ravaillac, was prosecutor of Angoulême, and two of his uncles were canons of the Cathedral of Angouleme. His father Jean Ravaillac was a violent man whose many misdeeds were a public scandal and caused legal difficulties; his mother Françoise Dubreuil (sister of the canons) was known for her Catholic piety. The son Ravaillac began work as a servant, later becoming a school teacher. Obsessed by religion, he sought admission to the ascetic Feuillants order, but after a short probation, he was dismissed as being "prey to visions." An application in 1606 for admission to the Society of Jesus was also unsuccessful.

Regicide

In 1609, Ravaillac claimed to have experienced a vision instructing him to convince King Henry IV to convert the Huguenots to Catholicism. Between Pentecost 1609 and May 1610, Ravaillac made three separate trips to Paris to tell his vision to the king, and lodged with Charlotte du Tillet, mistress of Jean Louis de Nogaret de La Valette, duc d'Épernon.  Unable to meet the king, Ravaillac interpreted Henry's decision to invade the Spanish Netherlands as the start of a war against the pope. Determined to stop him, he decided to kill the king.

On 14 May 1610, Ravaillac lay in wait in the Rue de la Ferronnerie in Paris (now south of the Forum des Halles); when the king passed, his carriage was halted by a blockage in the street, and Ravaillac stabbed Henry to death. Pierre de l'Estoile, the chronicler, stated of the king:

Hercule, Duke of Montbazon riding with Henry was wounded in the attack. Ravaillac was immediately seized by police and taken to the Hôtel de Retz to avoid a mob lynching.  He was transferred to the Conciergerie.

Trial and execution

During interrogation, Ravaillac was frequently tortured to make him identify accomplices, but he denied that he had any and insisted that he had acted alone. His knowledge of the king's route and the blockage of traffic that put the king within reach excited speculation. The king was on his way to visit  Sully, who lay ill in the Arsenal; his purpose was to make final preparations for imminent military intervention in the  disputed succession to  Jülich-Cleves-Berg after the death of Duke John William. Intervention on behalf of a Calvinist candidate would have brought France into conflict with the Catholic Habsburg dynasty. Ravaillac seems to have learned of the plans; in his tortured mind, "he had seen that the king wanted to make war on the pope, in order to transfer the Holy See to Paris".

At the start of the interrogation, Ravaillac said, "I know very well he is dead; I saw the blood on my knife and the place where I hit him. But I have no regrets at all about dying, because I've done what I came to do."

On May 27 he was taken to the Place de Grève in Paris and was tortured one last time before being  pulled apart by four horses, a method of execution reserved for regicides. Alistair Horne describes the torture Ravaillac suffered: "Before being drawn and quartered... he was scalded with burning sulphur, molten lead and boiling oil and resin, his flesh then being torn by pincers."  Following his execution, Ravaillac's parents were forced into exile, and the rest of his family was ordered  never to use the name "Ravaillac" again.

In January 1611, Mme Jacqueline d'Escoman, who had known Ravaillac, denounced the Duc d'Épernon as the one responsible for the death of Henry IV; she was jailed for the rest of her life. Philippe Erlanger, in his book L'Étrange Mort de Henri IV (1957, rev. 1999), reveals Épernon's association with Ravaillac through his mistress.  He concludes that he, the King's mistress Henriette d'Entragues and Charlotte du Tillet planned the assassination. The contrary view, that Ravaillac had no accomplices but his confessors,
is expressed by Roland Mousnier in L'Assassinat d'Henri IV: 14 mai 1610 (Paris, 1964).

See also 
 Jacques Clément, who assassinated King Henry III of France in 1589.
 Jean Châtel, who attempted to assassinate King Henry IV of France in 1595.
 Michael Piekarski, who, inspired by Ravaillac, attempted to assassinate Sigismund III of Poland in 1620.
 Robert-François Damiens, who attempted to assassinate King Louis XV of France in 1757.

Notes

References

  Garrisson, Janine (1993) Ravaillac, le fou de Dieu, Paris: Payot (a novelized psychological study of Ravaillac)
 Horne, Alastair (2004) La Belle France: a Short History. New York: Vintage Books, a division of Random House, Inc. 
 Mousnier, Roland (1973) The Assassination of Henry IV: The tyrannicide problem and the consolidation of the French absolute monarchy in the early seventeenth century, New York: Scribner

External links
 Henri IV - An unfinished reign Officiel website of the French Ministry of Culture

Jakub Sobieski about the Execution of Ravaillac and a French Cannibal at the Wilanów Palace Museum

17th-century French criminals
1578 births
1610 deaths
People from Angoulême
People executed by dismemberment
French regicides
Executed people from Poitou-Charentes
French Roman Catholics
17th-century executions by France
People executed by torture
Executed assassins
Murder in 1610
1610 murders in Europe